Omanimerelina is a genus of minute sea snails, marine gastropod mollusks or micromollusks in the family Rissoidae.

Species
Species within the genus Omanimerelina include:

 Omanimerelina eloiseae Moolenbeek & Bosch, 2007

References

Rissoidae
Monotypic gastropod genera